Cantonment MRT station is a future underground Mass Rapid Transit (MRT) station on the Circle line (CCL), situated in Bukit Merah planning area, Singapore, along Everton Road near the junction of Spottiswoode Park Road. This station is part of Stage 6 of the Circle line which will "close the circle" between the HarbourFront and Marina Bay stations.

The station is built underneath and will be integrated with the historic Tanjong Pagar railway station, which ceased operations on 1 July 2011. Cantonment station will provide MRT access to the future Greater Southern Waterfront development. The station was to be opened in 2025 along with the other CCL6 stations, but was delayed to 2026 due to the COVID-19 pandemic.

History

The station was first announced on 29 October 2015 as part of the Stage 6 of the Circle line. Construction began that year, with expected completion in 2026.

In November 2017, the old train platform canopy structures were relocated to facilitate construction works of the station to a restoration yard nearby. In March 2018, the Land Transport Authority (LTA) has temporarily dismantled part of the platforms in Tanjong Pagar railway station to make way for the construction of Cantonment MRT station and is working with a heritage consultant and members of the heritage community on possible solutions for the affected platforms. In September 2020, the Sun Wu TBM managed to tunnel underneath the old Tanjong Pagar Railway station building..

Tunnelling works for the CCL6 were completed on 12 January 2022, with a final tunnel breakthrough from Prince Edward Road station into this station. Prior to the tunnelling works, an extensive survey was conducted to ensure that the tunnels do not cross through the building's foundations. Structures were erected to protect the railway station's facade and interior, and monitoring instruments were installed to watch out for any building settlement. To construct the tunnels to Keppel station, the Keppel viaduct had to be closely monitored while underpinning the viaduct with new micro piles. Three bored piles were removed for the tunnelling works.

Station details

Station design
When completed, the station is expected to be integrated with the Tanjong Pagar railway station. The affected canopy structures is expected to be reinstated to their original locations once the station is finished.

References

External links

Bukit Merah
Mass Rapid Transit (Singapore) stations
Buildings and structures in Central Region, Singapore
Railway stations scheduled to open in 2026